Gogane may refer to:

Gogane, Kosi, Nepal
Gogane, Narayani, Nepal